Wensten van der Linde (born 29 April 1990) is a South African soccer player who plays as a goalkeeper for Premier Soccer League club TS Galaxy.

Club career
Van der Linde started his career at NFD club Milano United in 2013, joining from Stars of Africa football academy.

Van der Linde joined University of Pretoria nicknamed AmaTuks in 2016.

He was signed by Mbombela United in 2018.

He joined TS Galaxy in October 2020 from Mbombela United.

References

External links
 

1990 births
Living people
South African soccer players
South African Premier Division players
National First Division players
University of Pretoria F.C. players
Milano United F.C. players
Mbombela United F.C. players
TS Galaxy F.C. players
Association football goalkeepers